Laurence Leavy (born October 13, 1956), better known as Marlins Man, is an American sports fan and lawyer from North Miami Beach, Florida. He gained fame in 2012 for his frequent appearances at major sporting events while wearing orange Miami Marlins apparel. His seating placement in view of broadcast cameras has drawn attention at the World Series, Super Bowl, NBA Finals, Kentucky Derby, College World Series, and other events. Leavy has been described by USA Today as a "ubiquitous superfan".

Rise to prominence
Leavy's presence was first noted while attending a 2012 NBA Playoffs basketball game featuring the Miami Heat, where the team distributed white T-shirts before the game. Leavy had attended a Marlins game earlier the same day, and the white T-shirt he was given at the door was stolen from his seat, causing him to be visible on television in his now trademark orange Marlins jersey and visor. Later that year, Leavy was seen sitting behind home plate at AT&T Park during the World Series between the San Francisco Giants and the Detroit Tigers. The following day, a park ranger Leavy met near the Golden Gate Bridge coined the term "Marlins Man".

Leavy credits his rise to prominence to the new orange uniforms introduced by the Miami Marlins in 2012. Previously, he dressed in the team's white jersey with teal pinstripes, which was not noticeable in the stands. He increased his presence at sporting events after being diagnosed with liver cancer in 2014, although the diagnosis was later proven incorrect. In a 2017 interview, Leavy said he had attended 27 Super Bowls, 94 World Series games, 90 NBA Finals games, and "hundreds and hundreds of basketball and baseball playoffs games" to date. His presence at baseball games is so ubiquitous that he is depicted in the stands in the video game MLB: The Show.

In a 2014 interview, Leavy estimated that he spent an average of 300 days per year traveling to sporting events. He covers his airline fares with frequent-flyer miles and his hotel and car rental fees with credit card points. However, he pays for his front-row seats at sporting events in cash.

Leavy is popular with fans and is often asked to pose for selfies. He has tens of thousands of followers on Twitter, Instagram, and Facebook. In addition to buying his own season tickets, he often buys season tickets for clients and friends, and orders drinks for newfound stadium friends.

Leavy owns several "Marlins Man" jerseys and occasionally gives them away on behalf of charities, as when he listed his jersey, visor, and tickets from the 2014 World Series on eBay and garnered $5,621 for the Make-A-Wish Foundation. He has also given away jerseys on behalf of the March of Dimes.

Break with the Marlins
According to Leavy, he began attending Miami Marlins games as a full season ticket holder in 1993, the year the team started. In March 2018 he told ESPN that he planned to discontinue his 25-year history of purchasing season tickets due to disagreements with the club over pricing. In December 2017 he offered $200,000 for four Diamond Club seats behind home plate for the 2018, 2019, and 2020 seasons, claiming a 10 percent discount "for the Marlins' lack of stars" following the team's trading away Giancarlo Stanton, Christian Yelich, Dee Gordon, and Marcell Ozuna, and another 10 percent discount for advance payment. The Marlins countered with an offer of $263,000 for the four seats and a credit for two season-ticket seats in the outfield. Leavy rejected the offer and said he would no longer attend Marlins home games.

On September 17, 2018, Leavy signed a one-day "contract" with the Marlins after posting the winning bid at a charity auction to be "player for a day".

Events attended

Leavy has been seen at the following events:
 On Sunday, October 28, 2012, Leavy attended Game 4 of the 2012 World Series between the Detroit Tigers and the San Francisco Giants.
 In May 2014, behind the Oklahoma City Thunder bench in a Western Conference semifinals playoff game against the Los Angeles Clippers.
 On October 21, 2014, Leavy sat behind home plate at Kauffman Stadium for the first game of the 2014 World Series between the Kansas City Royals and San Francisco Giants. His bright orange jersey—visible on every pitch taken from the center-field camera—agitated the Royals team and management, and he was offered a private suite if he would move out of his seat, or free World Series mementoes if he would cover up or put on a Royals jersey. Leavy, who had paid $8,000 for the seat, refused to change his outfit or move.
 In May 2015, at the finish line at the 2015 Preakness Stakes, in which American Pharoah completed the second leg of the Triple Crown.
 In June 2015, attending his 70th NBA Finals game (Game 4) at Quicken Loans Arena, as the Cleveland Cavaliers hosted the Golden State Warriors.
 In October 2015, at both MLB Wild Card games, in which the Houston Astros defeated the New York Yankees, and the Pittsburgh Pirates fell to the Chicago Cubs. He attended both series of the ALDS in which the Kansas City Royals defeated the Astros (attended games 1, 5 – Wore a blue Royals hat in game 5 instead of his usual orange Marlins visor) and the Toronto Blue Jays defeated the Texas Rangers. He also attended both series of the NLDS, in which the Cubs defeated the St. Louis Cardinals (attended game 3), and the New York Mets defeated the Los Angeles Dodgers. He was seen, again, attending the ALCS (Games 1, 2, 6 – He wore a blue hat in the 7th inning of game 6), in which the Royals defeated the Blue Jays, and the NLCS (Games 3, 4), in which the Mets defeated the Cubs. He attended all five games of the World Series between the Mets and the Royals. All in all, Leavy attended 148 games during the 2015 MLB season.
 On October 16, 2016, Leavy attended Game 2 of the 2016 National League Championship Series between the Los Angeles Dodgers and the Chicago Cubs. Also in attendance was Marlins Woman, his girlfriend. His "girlfriend" was ultimately found out to be PFT Commenter of Barstool Sports.
 On May 10, 2017, Leavy bought the entire second row behind home plate for a Miami Marlins home game, bringing in women whom he asked to "jump up and down and cheer" to distract the opposing team. One woman flashed St. Louis Cardinals relief pitcher Brett Cecil during his windup.
 Between October 12 and 20, 2018, Leavy attended Games 1 through 7 of the 2018 National League Championship Series between the Los Angeles Dodgers and the Milwaukee Brewers. He sat behind home plate, a few seats towards the first base dugout.
 On October 5, 2019, he sat behind home plate at Yankee Stadium for Game 2 of the American League Division Series between the New York Yankees and Minnesota Twins, seated beside former New York City mayor Rudy Giuliani.

Personal life
Leavy owns a workers' compensation firm, Laurence Leavy & Associates, with offices in Davie and Jacksonville, Florida. He works several billable hours per day from his hotel rooms while traveling, noting that only 1 percent of his cases go to trial. Since 1987 he has served as president of the Workers Compensation Legal Center. He earned his undergraduate degree at Emory University, his MBA at Florida State University, and his Juris Doctor degree at the University of Miami Law School.

Leavy is the owner of Starship Stables and more than 100 Thoroughbreds.

References

External links
 

1956 births
Living people
Florida lawyers
Miami Marlins
Baseball spectators
American racehorse owners and breeders
People from North Miami Beach, Florida
University of Miami School of Law alumni